Robert Ernest "Bob" Hall (born August 13, 1943) is an American economist and a Robert and Carole McNeil Senior Fellow at Stanford University's Hoover Institution. He is generally considered a macroeconomist, but he describes himself as an "applied economist".

Hall received a BA in economics at the University of California, Berkeley, and a PhD in economics from MIT for a thesis titled Essays on the Theory of Wealth under the supervision of Robert Solow.

Hall is a member of the Hoover Institution, the National Academy of Sciences, a fellow at both American Academy of Arts and Sciences and the Econometric Society, and a member of the NBER. He is the chairman of the Business Cycle Dating Committee, the body responsible for setting the start and end dates of U.S. economic recessions. Hall served as president of the American Economic Association in 2010, and is a long-time member of the Brookings Panel on Economic Activity.

Ideas
Hall has a broad range of interests, including technology, competition, employment, and policy.

 Hall is perhaps most famous for co-originating the flat tax with Alvin Rabushka. They co-authored a book with the same name. The two often act as advisors to countries in Eastern Europe that wish to adopt the flat tax.
 In 1978, Hall changed the direction of research on consumption by showing that under rational expectations, consumption should be a martingale. Prior to this, influenced by Milton Friedman's permanent income hypothesis under adaptive expectations, economists had expected past income to affect current consumption by altering individuals' expectations about their permanent income. Instead, Hall's theory pointed to a relation between current consumption and expected future income, which implied that consumption should only change when there is surprising news about income. This, in turn, implies that changes in consumption should be unpredictable (which is called the 'martingale' property in statistics). Hall surprised the macroeconomic profession by providing evidence that consumption was, in fact, unpredictable. Subsequent evidence has shown that consumption is more predictable than he claimed, but ever since Hall's paper most empirical research on consumption has taken the martingale case as the baseline and focused on what mechanisms could cause deviations from martingale consumption.
 In 1982 Hall proposed the commodity based, alternative currency ANCAP.
 In describing if marginal cost is procyclical, Hall argued that the key is knowing the productivity shocks in real business cycle theory are actually the result of monopoly power. Because monopolies can sell where their price exceeds marginal cost, they tend to have excess capacity. Thus, as demand increases, the excess capacity shrinks and marginal cost approaches price and in that way it is procyclical. This idea captures the distinction between real productivity and productivity growth; while there is greater productivity (less is being wasted), workers aren't becoming more productive.
 To explain sticky wages, Hall emphasizes the importance of costs borne by the employer. Firms benefit when times are good but are penalized when times are slim (because wages are usually fixed) and they pay for searching for a good employee/employer match. Thus, employers are more risk averse in hiring and have less incentive to engage in search. Hence employers simply do not hire in down times. Since workers cannot collectively signal that they would work for less in down times, wages have a tendency to stick upwards.
 He also supported the Reagan tax cuts: "If we don't have a tax cut, there will be that much more room for pouring money down rat holes."

References

External links
 Stanford home page

1943 births
Labor economists
Living people
21st-century American economists
Fellows of the Econometric Society
Macroeconomists
Time series econometricians
Members of the United States National Academy of Sciences
New classical economists
University of California, Berkeley alumni
MIT School of Humanities, Arts, and Social Sciences alumni
Stanford University Department of Economics faculty
Presidents of the American Economic Association
Fellows of the American Academy of Arts and Sciences